El Chorrito is a pilgrimage center located in the municipality of Hidalgo, Tamaulipas.

Catholic pilgrimage sites